is a Japanese voice actress. She is the official dubbing roles for Kristen Stewart, especially in The Twilight Saga series.

Filmography

Television animation
Blue Dragon (????) – Valkyrie
Net Ghost PiPoPa (????) – Eriko Murata, Bot
Princess Tutu (2004) – female student (ep 16); Girl (ep 15); Waniko (ep 10)
Magical Girl Lyrical Nanoha (2004) – director Makihara (ep 1); Player (ep 3); Student (ep 9); Woman (ep 2)
Elemental Gelade (2005) – Lapis; Mode
Mahoraba: Heartful days (2005) – Miyabi Shirogane; Tachibana
Musashi Gundoh (2006) – Yukimura Sanada
Night Head Genesis (2006) – Hiroko Sato
Strawberry Panic! (2006) – Kaname Kenjo
Kanon (2007) – Waitress
The Familiar of Zero: Rondo of Princesses (2008) – Brigitte
Phantom: Requiem for the Phantom (2009) – Eva Stone
Beelzebub (2011) – Misaki Oga, Lord En
Level E (2011) – Tachibana
The File of Young Kindaichi Returns (2014) – Kiyoko Shikibu
Pikaia! (2015) – Irma
Gravity Rush: Overture (2016) – Raven
Pocket Monsters: Sun & Moon (2017-18) – Lusamine
Kamisama Minarai: Himitsu no Cocotama (2017) – Tama-Shine
Pikaia!! (2017) – Irma
The Ancient Magus' Bride (2018) – Elias Ainsworth (Female Form)
The Legend of the Galactic Heroes: Die Neue These Kaikō (2018) – Jessica Edwards
Karakuri Circus (2018) - Naya Steele
Boogiepop and Others (2019) – Makiko Kisugi
One Piece (2019) – Mororon
My Hero Academia (2020) - Rumi Usagiyama/Mirko
Black Clover (2020) – Bow Nokde
Birdie Wing: Golf Girls' Story (2022) – Klein Clara
Pocket Monsters: The Series (2022) – Lusamine

Original video animation (OVA)
Papillon Rose (2003) – Sister Biene
Aki Sora (2009) – Sora Aoi
Brotherhood: Final Fantasy XV (2016) – Gentiana

Video games
Gravity Rush (2012) – Raven
Gravity Rush Remastered (2015) – Raven
Overwatch (2016) - Athena
Final Fantasy XV (2016) – Gentiana
Gravity Rush 2 (2017) – Raven
Action Taimanin (2019) – Ingrid
Biohazard Village (2021) – Mother Miranda*

Dubbing

Live-action
Kristen Stewart
Twilight – Bella Swan
The Twilight Saga: New Moon – Bella Swan
The Twilight Saga: Eclipse – Bella Swan
The Twilight Saga: Breaking Dawn – Part 1 – Bella Swan
The Twilight Saga: Breaking Dawn – Part 2 – Bella Swan
Still Alice – Lydia Howland
American Ultra – Phoebe Larson
Personal Shopper – Maureen Cartwright
Billy Lynn's Long Halftime Walk – Kathryn Lynn
Charlie's Angels – Sabina Wilson
Seberg – Jean Seberg
Underwater – Norah Price
50/50 – Rachael (Bryce Dallas Howard)
Abduction – Karen Murphy (Lily Collins)
Anaconda 3: Offspring – Dr. Amanda Hayes (Crystal Allen)
Anna Karenina – Princess Darya "Dolly" Alexandrovna Oblonskaya (Kelly Macdonald)
Ava – Ava Faulkner (Jessica Chastain)
Babylon A.D. – Aurora (Mélanie Thierry)
Bacurau – Teresa (Bárbara Colen)
Batman Begins (2008 Fuji TV edition) – Rachel Dawes (Katie Holmes)
Beverly Hills Cop II (Netflix edition) – Karla Fry (Brigitte Nielsen)
Bleeding Steel – Xiao Su (Erica Xia-hou)
Brawl in Cell Block 99 – Lauren Thomas (Jennifer Carpenter)
The Butterfly Effect 3: Revelations – Jenna Reide (Rachel Miner)
By Way of Helena – Marisol (Alice Braga)
The Chaser – Kim Mi-jin (Seo Young-hee)
Death Race – Case (Natalie Martinez)
Deep Blue Sea 3 – Emma Collins (Tania Raymonde)
The Descendants – Alexandra "Alex" King (Shailene Woodley)
The Devil Inside – Isabella Rossi (Fernanda Andrade)
Final Destination 5 – Olivia Castle (Jacqueline MacInnes Wood)
From Vegas to Macau – Detective Luo Xin (Jing Tian)
Game of Thrones – Shae (Sibel Kekilli)
Gossip Girl – Elise Wells (Emma Demar), Agnes Andrews (Willa Holland), Lisa Loeb
Grand Piano – Ashley (Tamsin Egerton)
Great White – Kaz Fellows (Katrina Bowden)
House of Cards – Zoe Barnes (Kate Mara)
I Feel Pretty – Mallory (Emily Ratajkowski)
Jigsaw – Anna (Laura Vandervoort)
John Carter – Sarah Carter (Amanda Clayton)
Krampus – Max Engel (Emjay Anthony)
Live by Night – Graciela Corrales (Zoe Saldana)
The Lord of the Rings: The Rings of Power – Míriel (Cynthia Addai-Robinson)
Magic Mike XXL – Zoe (Amber Heard)
Martha Marcy May Marlene – Martha/Marcy May/"Marlene" Lewis (Elizabeth Olsen)
Morgan – Lee Weathers (Kate Mara)
The Mortal Instruments: City of Bones – Clarissa Fray/Clarissa Morgenstern (Lily Collins)
Nelyubov – Zhenya (Maryana Spivak)
Mortal Kombat – Sonya Blade (Jessica McNamee)
NCIS: Los Angeles – Kensi Blye (Daniela Ruah)
New Amsterdam – Dr. Helen Sharpe (Freema Agyeman)
Numb – Cheryl (Marie Avgeropoulos)
Office Christmas Party – Tracey Hughes (Olivia Munn)
Once Upon a Time – Queen Elsa (Georgina Haig)
Patient Zero – Dr. Gina Rose (Natalie Dormer)
Penny Dreadful – Vanessa Ives (Eva Green)
Peter Rabbit – Mopsy Rabbit
Peter Rabbit 2: The Runaway – Mopsy Rabbit
Police Story 2013 – Miao Miao (Jing Tian)
The Predator – Dr. Casey Bracket (Olivia Munn)
Push – Kira Hudson / Hollis (Camilla Belle)
Quantico – Alex Parrish (Priyanka Chopra)
Ruby Sparks – Ruby Tiffany Sparks (Zoe Kazan)
Santa's Slay – Mary McKenzie (Emilie de Ravin)
Scream – Amber Freeman (Mikey Madison)
Shang-Chi and the Legend of the Ten Rings – Ying Li (Fala Chen)
Stalingrad – Katya (Maria Smolnikova)
Step Up: All In – Alexxa Brava (Izabella Miko)
The Strangers – Dollface (Gemma Ward)
Straw Dogs – Amy Sumner (Kate Bosworth)
Stuber – Becca (Betty Gilpin)
Supergirl – Lena Luthor (Katie McGrath)
Taken – Sheerah (Holly Valance)
Taxi Driver – Iris "Easy" Steensma (Jodie Foster)
Tekken – Christie Monteiro (Kelly Overton)
Transformers: The Last Knight – Quintessa (Gemma Chan)
The Transporter Refueled – Anna (Loan Chabanol)
Turistas – Bea (Olivia Wilde)
Tusk – Ally Leon (Genesis Rodriguez)
Un plan parfait – Isabelle (Diane Kruger)
The Vampire Diaries – Elena Gilbert (Nina Dobrev)
Wanted (2019 BS Japan edition) – Cathy (Kristen Hager)
War Dogs – Iz (Ana de Armas)
The Ward – Kristen (Amber Heard)
Warrior – Ah Toy (Olivia Cheng)
White House Down – Jenna (Jackie Geary)
Wild Romance – Yoo Eun-jae (Lee Si-young)

Animation
Avengers Assemble – Black Widow
Code Lyoko – Yumi Ishiyama
Pucca – Pucca
Tinker Bell and the Lost Treasure – Viola
Ultimate Spider-Man – Black Widow
Winter Sonata Anime – Oh Chae-rin

References

External links
 Official agency profile 
 Sayaka Kinoshita at GamePlaza-Haruka Voice Acting Database 

Living people
Voice actresses from Chiba Prefecture
Japanese video game actresses
Japanese voice actresses
21st-century Japanese actresses
Year of birth missing (living people)